Shamitha Malnad (born 9 June) is an Indian Dentist, voice artist, playback singer. She is known for her works in the Kannada film industry, as well as her works from Sugama Sangeetha and Devotional albums.

Career
Shamitha Malnad was first introduced to the film music by music director Gurukiran in the film Ninagaagi in 2002. She has worked for music directors such as Hamsalekha, Gurukiran, V. Harikrishna, Mano Murthy, and others.

Discography

 Kariya
 Rama Shama Bhama
 Chellata
 Birugaali
 Madana
 Paramesha Panwala
 Jugaari
 Nam Areal Ond Dina
 Cheluveye Ninne Nodalu
 Kempe Gowda
 Super
 Mandya
 Aptharakshaka
 Mylari
 Nagavalli
 Shrimathi
 Dandam Dashagunam
 Saarathi
 Jarasandha

 Johny Mera Naam Preethi Mera Kaam

 Muddu Manase
 Nagavalli

Awards
 2009 - Filmfare Award for Best Female Playback Singer – Kannada - "Madhura Pisumaatige (Birugaali)
 2015 - Karnataka State Film Award for Best Female Playback Singer - "Thalamalada Maleyalli" (Bekku)

References

External links

 

Living people
Indian women playback singers
Filmfare Awards South winners
Kannada playback singers
People from Shimoga district
Film musicians from Karnataka
Year of birth missing (living people)
Singers from Bangalore
Women musicians from Karnataka
21st-century Indian women singers
21st-century Indian singers